This article contains a list of libraries that can be used in .NET languages. These languages require .NET Framework, Mono, or .NET, which provide a basis for software development, platform independence, language interoperability and extensive framework libraries. Standard Libraries (including the Base Class Library) are not included in this article.

Preamble 
Apps created with .NET Framework or .NET run in a software environment known as the Common Language Runtime (CLR), an application virtual machine that provides services such as security, memory management, and exception handling. The framework includes a large class library called Framework Class Library (FCL).

Thanks to the hosting virtual machine, different .NET CLI-compliant languages can operate on the same kind of data structures. Therefore, all CLI-compliant languages can use FCL and other .NET libraries that are written in one of the CLI compliant languages. When the source code of a CLI-compliant language is compiled, the compiler generates platform-independent code in the Common Intermediate Language (CIL, also referred to as bytecode), which is stored in CLI assemblies. When a .NET app runs, the just-in-time compiler (JIT) turns the CIL code into platform-specific machine code. To improve performance, .NET Framework also comes with the Native Image Generator (NGEN), which performs ahead-of-time compilation to machine code.

This architecture provides language interoperability. Each language can use code written in other languages. Calls from one language to another are exactly the same as would be within a single programming language. If a library is written in one CLI language, it can be used in other CLI languages. Moreover, apps that consist only of pure .NET assemblies, can be transferred to any platform that contains an implementation of CLI and run on that platform. For example, apps written using .NET can run on Windows, macOS, and various versions of Linux. 

.NET apps or their libraries, however, may depend on native platform features, e.g. COM. As such, platform independence of .NET apps depends on the ability to transfer necessary native libraries to target platforms. In 2019, the Windows Forms and Windows Presentation Foundation portions of .NET Framework were made open source.

.NET implementations 

There are four primary .NET implementations that are actively developed and maintained:

 .NET Framework: The original .NET implementation that has existed since 2002. While not yet discontinued, Microsoft does not plan on releasing its next major version, 5.0.
 Mono: A cross-platform implementation of .NET Framework by Ximian, introduced in 2004. It is free and open-source. It is now developed by Xamarin, a subsidiary of Microsoft.
 Universal Windows Platform (UWP): An implementation of .NET used for building UWP apps. It's designed to unify development for different targeted types of devices, including PCs, tablets, phablets, phones, and the Xbox.
 .NET: A cross-platform re-implementation of .NET Framework, introduced in 2016 and initially called .NET Core. It is free and open-source. .NET superseded .NET Framework with the release of .NET 5.

Each implementation of .NET includes the following components:

 One or more runtime environments, e.g. CLR for .NET Framework and CoreCLR for .NET
 A class library 

The .NET Standard is a set of common APIs that are implemented in the Base Class Library of any .NET implementation. The class library of each implementation must implement the .NET Standard, but may also implement additional APIs. Traditionally, .NET apps targeted a certain version of a .NET implementation, e.g. .NET Framework 4.6. Starting with the .NET Standard, an app can target a version of the .NET Standard and then it could be used (without recompiling) by any implementation that supports that level of the standard. This enables portability across different .NET implementations.

The following table lists the .NET implementations that adhere to the .NET Standard and the version number at which each implementation became compliant with a given version of .NET Standard. For example, according to this table, .NET Core 3.0 was the first version of .NET Core that adhered to .NET Standard 2.1. This means that any version of .NET Core bigger than 3.0 (e.g. .NET Core 3.1) also adheres to .NET Standard 2.1.

Web frameworks 
ASP.NET a server-side web application framework designed for web development to produce dynamic web pages. It is the successor to Microsoft's Active Server Pages (ASP) technology built on the Common Language Runtime (CLR). It provides separate patterns for developing web applications ASP.NET MVC, ASP.NET Web API, and ASP.NET Web Pages (a platform using only Razor pages), which have merged into a unified MVC 6.
ASP.NET Core a successor and re-implementation of ASP.NET as a modular web framework, together with other frameworks like Entity Framework. The framework uses the new open-source .NET Compiler Platform (codename "Roslyn") and is cross platform.
Blazor a free and open-source web framework that enables developers to create Web apps using C# and HTML. Blazor Server apps are hosted on an ASP.NET Core server in ASP.NET Razor format, while Blazor WebAssembly apps are Single-page apps that are downloaded to the client's web browser before running.

Numerical libraries

Open-source numerical libraries 
AForge.NET a computer vision and artificial intelligence library. It implements a number of genetic, fuzzy logic and machine learning algorithms with several architectures of artificial neural networks with corresponding training algorithms.
ALGLIB a cross-platform open source numerical analysis and data processing library. It consists of algorithm collections written in different programming languages (C++, C#, FreePascal, Delphi, VBA) and has dual licensing – commercial and GPL.
Math.NET Numerics aims to provide methods and algorithms for numerical computations in science, engineering and every day use. Covered topics include special functions, linear algebra, probability models, random numbers, interpolation, integral transforms and more. MIT/X11 license.
Meta.Numerics is a library for advanced scientific computation in the .NET Framework.

Proprietary numerical libraries 
ILNumerics.Net a commercial high performance, typesafe numerical array classes and functions for general math, FFT and linear algebra, aims .NET/mono, 32&64 bit, script-like syntax in C#, 2D & 3D plot controls, efficient memory management. Released under GPLv3 or commercial license.
Measurement Studio a commercial integrated suite UI controls and class libraries for use in developing test and measurement applications. The analysis class libraries provide various digital signal processing, signal filtering, signal generation, peak detection, and other general mathematical functionality.
NMath Commercial numerical component libraries for the .NET platform by CenterSpace Software, including signal processing (FFT) classes, a linear algebra (LAPACK & BLAS) framework, and a statistics package.

3D graphics

Open-source 3D graphics 
Open Toolkit (OpenTK) a low-level C# binding for OpenGL, OpenGL ES and OpenAL. It runs on Windows, Linux, Mac OS X, BSD, Android and iOS. It can be used standalone or integrated into a GUI.
Windows Presentation Foundation (WPF) a graphical subsystem for rendering user interfaces, developed by Microsoft. It also contains a 3D rendering engine. In addition, interactive 2D content can be overlaid on 3D surfaces natively. It only runs on Windows operating systems.

Proprietary 3D graphics 
Unity a cross-platform game engine developed by Unity Technologies and used to develop video games for PC, consoles, mobile devices and websites.

Image processing 
AForge.NET a computer vision and artificial intelligence library. It implements a number of image processing algorithms and filters. It is released under the LGPLv3 and partly GPLv3 license. Majority of the library is written in C# and thus cross-platform. Functionality of AForge.NET has been extended by the Accord.NET library.
Accord.NET another computer vision and artificial intelligence library, available under the Gnu Lesser General Public License, version 2.1. It is mainly written in C#.

Graphical user interface 
Gtk# C# wrappers around the underlying GTK+ and GNOME libraries, written in C and available on Linux, MacOS and Windows.

Windows Forms (WinForms) Microsoft GUI framework. The original Microsoft implementation runs on Windows operating systems and provides access to Windows User Interface Common Controls by wrapping the Windows API in managed code. The alternative Mono implementation is open source and cross-platform (it runs on Windows, Linux, Unix and OS X). It is mainly compatible with the original implementation but not completely. The library is written in C# in order to avoid Windows dependence.
At the Microsoft Connect event on December 4, 2018, Microsoft announced releasing of Windows Forms as open source project on GitHub. It is released under the MIT License. Windows Forms has become available for projects targeting the .NET framework. However, the framework is still available only on Windows platform and the Mono incomplete implementation of WinForms remains the only cross-platform implementation.

Windows Presentation Foundation (WPF) a graphical subsystem for rendering user interfaces in Windows-based applications by Microsoft. It is based on DirectX and employs XAML, an XML-based language, to define and link various interface elements. WPF applications can be deployed as standalone desktop programs or hosted as an embedded object in a website.
At the Microsoft Connect event on December 4, 2018, Microsoft announced releasing of WPF as open source project on GitHub. It is released under the MIT License. Windows Presentation Foundation has become available for projects targeting the .NET framework. However, the system is still available only on Windows platform.

Windows UI Library (WinUI) a set of Microsoft UI controls and features for the Universal Windows Platform (UWP). At the Microsoft Connect event on December 4, 2018, Microsoft announced releasing of WinUI as open source project on GitHub. WinUI has become available for projects targeting the .NET framework. It is released under the MIT License. However, the library is still available only on Windows platform.

Xamarin.Forms a cross-platform UI toolkit for development of native user interfaces that can be run on macOS, iOS, Android, and Universal Windows Platform apps. 

.NET Multi-platform App UI (.NET MAUI) a cross-platform UI toolkit announced in May 2020 that originated as a fork of Xamarin.Forms and that can run on Android, iOS, Linux, macOS, Tizen, and Windows. .NET MAUI will run on .NET 6 and later. The source code is licensed under MIT License and available on GitHub.

Quality assurance 
NUnit an open source unit testing framework for .NET, written in C# and thus cross-platform. It is one of many programs in the xUnit family. Licensed under MIT License.

Object–relational mapping 
.NET Framework natively provides utilities for object–relational mapping through ADO.NET, a part of .NET stack since .NET 1.0. In addition, a number of third-party object–relational libraries have emerged, especially in earlier years of the .NET development, in order to fill some perceived gaps of the framework.

As the framework has evolved, additional object–relational tools were added, such as the Entity Framework included with the .NET Framework 3.5. LINQ to SQL was also introduced with .NET 3.5. This somehow reduced significance and popularity of third-party object–relational libraries.

Entity Framework an open source object–relational mapping (ORM) framework for ADO.NET. It was a part of .NET Framework, but since Entity framework version 6 it is separated from .NET framework.
NHibernateNHibernate is an object–relational mapper for the .NET platform.

Notes

References

External links 
General:
 .NET Open Source Developer Projects, a list maintained at GitHub

Numerical libraries:
 The Math Forum - Math Libraries, an extensive list of mathematical libraries with short descriptions
 Guide - Math and Statistics Programming with F# 
Data:
 Object Relational Mapping
 Comparison of Object Relational Mapping Tools for the .NET Framework

.NET software
Programming tools
.NET libraries and frameworks
Computer libraries
Numerical libraries
Graphics libraries
Free and open-source software